Rometta (Sicilian: Ramietta) is a comune (municipality) in the Metropolitan City of Messina in the Italian region Sicily, located about  east of Palermo and about  west of Messina.  It was the last bastion of Sicily controlled by the Eastern Roman Empire (Byzantium), and falling only in 965 to the Kalbids' Muslim army in the Siege of Rometta.

Rometta borders the following municipalities: Messina, Monforte San Giorgio, Roccavaldina, Saponara, Venetico, Spadafora.

References

External links
 Official website
 Rometta - Website dedicated to the city